Gmina Międzyrzec Podlaski is a rural gmina (administrative district) in Biała Podlaska County, Lublin Voivodeship, in eastern Poland. Its seat is the town of Międzyrzec Podlaski, although the town is not part of the territory of the gmina.

Villages
Gmina Międzyrzec Podlaski contains the villages and settlements of Bereza, Dołhołęka, Halasy, Jelnica, Kolonia Wolańska, Koszeliki, Kożuszki, Krzewica, Krzymoszyce, Łuby, Łukowisko, Łuniew, Manie, Misie, Pościsze, Przychody, Przyłuki, Puchacze, Rogoźnica, Rogoźnica-Kolonia, Rogoźniczka, Rudniki, Rzeczyca, Sawki, Sitno, Strzakły, Tłuściec, Tuliłów, Utrówka, Wólka Krzymowska, Wysokie, Żabce, Zaścianki, Zasiadki and Zawadki.

Neighbouring gminas
Gmina Międzyrzec Podlaski is bordered by the town of Międzyrzec Podlaski and by the gminas of Biała Podlaska, Drelów, Huszlew, Kąkolewnica Wschodnia, Olszanka, Trzebieszów and Zbuczyn.

References

External links
Polish official population figures 2006

Miedzyrzec Podlaski
Biała Podlaska County